The Dixon Correctional Center is a medium security adult male prison of the Illinois Department of Corrections in Dixon, Illinois. The prison was opened in July 1983 and has an operational capacity of 2,529 prisoners.

References

External links
Dixon Correctional Center - John Howard Association of Illinois

Prisons in Illinois
1983 establishments in Illinois